Kumārasaṃbhavam ( "The Birth of Kumāra") is an epic poem by Kālidāsa. It is widely regarded as the finest work of Kālidāsa as well as the greatest kāvya poem in Classical Sanskrit. The style of description of spring set the standard for nature metaphors pervading many centuries of Indian literary tradition. Kumārasaṃbhavam basically talks about the birth of Kumara (Kārtikeya), the son of Shiva and Parvati. The period of composition is uncertain, although Kālidāsa is thought to have lived in the 5th century.

Legend say that Kālidāsa could not complete his epic Kumārasambhava because he was cursed by the goddess Pārvatī, for obscene descriptions of her conjugal life with Śiva in the eighth canto. But later it has inspired the famed sculpture of Khajuraho temples. The English renderings of these Sanskrit plays tend to avoid erotic and explicit aspects due to moral tastes of modern audience. The play depicts Kālidāsa as a court poet of Chandragupta who faces a trial on the insistence of a priest and some other moralists of his time.

Contents
Kumārasambhava literally means "The Birth of Kumāra". This epic of seventeen cantos entails Sringara rasa, the rasa of love, romance, and eroticism, more than Vira rasa (the rasa of heroism). Tārakāsura, a rakshasa (demon) was blessed that he could be killed by none other than Shiva's son, however, Shiva had won over Kama, the god of love. Parvati performed great tapas (or spiritual penance) to win the love of Shiva. Consequently, Shiva and Parvati's son Kartikeya was born to restore the glory of Indra, king of the Gods.

Adaptations
Kumara Sambhavam is a 1969 Indian film adaptation of the poem by P. Subramaniam.

References

Bibliography

External links

  full text of the Kumārasambhava in Devanāgarī script (first eight sargas)
 full text of the Kumārasambhava in Roman script at GRETIL
 The Birth of the War-God, selected translation by Arthur W. Ryder
 single folio of a Kumārasambhava manuscript in the Cambridge University Library
  Attempted English translation of text by RTH Griffith

Works by Kalidasa
Sanskrit poetry
Hindu literature
Epic poems in Sanskrit
Poems adapted into films
Ancient Indian poems